Marco Colombo (born 2 August 1960) is an Italian swimmer. He competed in three events at the 1984 Summer Olympics.

References

External links
 

1960 births
Living people
Italian male swimmers
Olympic swimmers of Italy
Swimmers at the 1984 Summer Olympics
Sportspeople from Bergamo